Charmaine Smith is an Australian Paralympic lawn bowler. At the 1976 Toronto Games, she won a gold medal with Adele Jackson in the Women's Pairs B and a silver medal in the Women's Singles B.

References 

Clare won 1 gold medal for pairs with Adele Jackson and 1 gold medal in the singles.

Lawn bowls players at the 1976 Summer Paralympics
Paralympic gold medalists for Australia
Paralympic silver medalists for Australia
Living people
Paralympic lawn bowls players of Australia
Australian female bowls players
Year of birth missing (living people)
Medalists at the 1976 Summer Paralympics
Paralympic medalists in lawn bowls